Player.pl or simply Player (formerly: tvn player) is a Polish video on demand and streaming television service launched on 26 August 2011.

The service offers programmes from TVN Warner Bros. Discovery (TVN, TVN 7, TVN Style, TVN Turbo, TVN24, TVN24 BiS, TTV), as well as external partners, including: Canal+, and HBO, Eleven Sports. The service is available through the website and through apps available on Android, Android TV, iOS, Orsay, PlayStation 4, Tizen, tvOS, and webOS.

References

External links
 Official website 

2011 establishments in Poland
Streaming television
TVN (Polish TV channel)
Video on demand services